The Flys were an American rock band, formed in Hollywood in 1994 by Adam Paskowitz and Josh Paskowitz. They are the sons of Doc Paskowitz, described by the New York Times as the "First Family of Surfing." The band has shared the stage and toured with many other well known acts and rock bands, but have been on indefinite hiatus since 2012. 

Their 1998 alternative top five hit "Got You (Where I Want You)", was produced by Chris Goss, and the video featured actors Katie Holmes and James Marsden. "Got You (Where I Want You)" was on their second album Holiday Man in 1998 and appeared on the soundtrack for the 1998 MGM film Disturbing Behavior,  starring Holmes and Marsden. The single reached No. 5 on the Modern Rock Charts and the album reached No. 109 on Billboard. 

A second single, "She's So Huge," was featured in the 2001 film Sugar & Spice, and The Crow: Salvation soundtrack, along with "What You Want." "She's So Huge" peaked at No. 32 on Modern Rock Charts. In 2000, The Flys released their third album, Outta My Way. The album contained the single "Losin' It", as well as two samples from two songs by the Beach Boys from their Pet Sounds album, "Here Today"  and "Caroline, No".

Around 2007, the band recruited actor/musician Jordan Lawson to play bass, Rob Jones to play drums, and George Castells to play guitar. In 2008 they announced on their MySpace page that they had returned with an iTunes single (a cover of the Beatles' "Hey Jude") along with a remake of their biggest hit, entitled "Got You Where I Want You 2008." The Flys toured many times during the band's lifespan, opening for other well known groups. After their last tour, the band went on hiatus.

Discography

Studio albums

Guest appearances

Music videos

References

External links

American post-grunge musical groups
Musical groups established in 1994
Musical groups disestablished in 2008
Musical groups from Los Angeles
1994 establishments in California